Darryl Hemphill (born March 29, 1960) is a former American football defensive back. He played for the Baltimore Colts in 1982, the Denver Gold from 1984 to 1985 and for the BC Lions in 1987.

References

1960 births
Living people
American football defensive backs
West Texas A&M Buffaloes football players
Baltimore Colts players
Denver Gold players
BC Lions players